Canthon chalcites is a species in the beetle family Scarabaeidae. It is found in North America.

References

Further reading

 

Deltochilini
Articles created by Qbugbot
Beetles described in 1843